Andy Croft (born 1956) is an English writer, editor, and poet based in North East England. His books include Red Letter Days, a history of British political fiction of the
1930s. Other books by Croft include Out of the Old Earth, A Weapon in the Struggle, Selected Poems of Randall Swingler, Comrade Heart, After the Party, A Creative Approach to Teaching Rhythm and Rhyme and Forty-six Quid and a Bag of Dirty Washing. He has written seven novels and 42 books for teenagers, mostly about football.

Writing residencies include the Hartlepool Headland, the Great North Run, the Southwell Poetry Festival, the Combe Down Stone Mines Project, HMP Holme House and HMP South Yorkshire. He has given many poetry readings, including readings in Paris, Moscow, Potsdam, Sofia, Novosibirsk, Kemerovo, New York and London's Poetry International. He writes a regular poetry column for the Morning Star, is director of the T-Junction International Poetry festival, and he runs Smokestack Books.

Bibliography

Collections of poetry 

 Nowhere Special (1996)
 Gaps Between Hills: Photographs (1996) with Mark Robinson and Dermot Blackburn
 Great North: A Poem of the Great North Run (2001)
 Just as Blue (2009)
 Comrade Laughter (2004)
 The Ghost Writer: A Novel in Verse (2008)
 Sticky (2009)
 Three Men on the Metro (2009) with W. N. Herbert and Paul Summers
 1948: A Novel in Verse (2012) with illustrations by Martin Rowson
 Letters to Randall Swingler (Shoestring Press, 2017)

Anthologies of poetry 

 Red Sky at Night: an anthology of British socialist poetry (2003), with Adrian Mitchell
 North by North East: the region's contemporary poetry (2006) with Cynthia Fuller
 Not Just a Game: an anthology of sporting poems (2006) with Sue Dymoke
 Speaking English: Poems for John Lucas (2007)
 The Night Shift (2010) with Michael Baron and Jenny Swann
 Everything Flows: A Celebration of the Transporter Bridge in Poetry (2012)
 A Modern Don Juan: Cantos for these Times by Divers Hands (2015) with Nigel Thompson and George Baron

Other publications 

 smoke! an historical pageant (2004, Mudfog) - commissioned as part of the 150th anniversary of Middlesbrough.
 Comrade Heart: A Life of Randall Swingler (2003), revised 2020 as The Years of Anger

References

External links
Andy Croft website
Smokestack Books website

1956 births
Living people
20th-century British poets
21st-century British poets